Sarauni is a census town in Godda CD block in Godda subdivision of Godda district in the Indian state of Jharkhand.

Geography

Location

Overview
Rajmahal coalfield is shown in the map. The entire area is overwhelmingly rural with only small pockets of urbanisation.

Note: The full screen map is interesting. All places marked on the map are linked and you can easily move on to another page of your choice. Enlarge the map to see what else is there – one gets railway links, many more road links and so on.

Demographics
According to the 2011 Census of India, Sarauni had a total population of 4,970, of which 2,542 (51%) were males and 2,428 (49%) were females. Population in the age range 0–6 years was 856. The total number of literate persons in Sarauni was 2,723 (66.19% of the population over 6 years).

Infrastructure
According to the District Census Handbook 2011, Godda, Sarauni covered an area of 3.71 km2. Among the civic amenities, it had 10 km roads with open drains, the protected water supply involved hand pump, uncovered well. It had 211 domestic electric connections, 5 road light points. Among the educational facilities it had 2 primary schools, 1 middle school, 1 secondary school, 1 senior secondary school. It had the branch office of 1 cooperative bank.

References

Cities and towns in Godda district